Podgornoye is a rural locality (a selo) and the administrative center of Chainsky District in Tomsk Oblast, Russia. Population:

Geography
The confluence of rivers Chaya and Iksa is located close to the village.

References

Rural localities in Tomsk Oblast